The Chocó–Darién moist forests (NT0115) is an ecoregion in the west of Colombia and east of Panama. The region has extremely high rainfall, and the forests hold great biodiversity.
The northern and southern parts of the ecoregion have been considerably modified for ranching and farming, and there are threats from logging for paper pulp, uncontrolled gold mining, coca growing and industrialisation, but the central part of the ecoregion is relatively intact.

Geography

Location 
The Chocó–Darién moist forests extend along most of the Pacific coast of Colombia and extend north into Panama along the Caribbean coast.
They are bounded to the east by the Andes, which separate them from the Amazon and Orinoco ecoregions.
In Colombia the ecoregion is in the Chocó, Cauca, Valle del Cauca and Nariño departments. In Panama it is in the Darién and Guna Yala provinces.

The northern section merges into Isthmian-Atlantic moist forests to the west in the Isthmus of Panama, and contains patches of Eastern Panamanian montane forests.
Along the Caribbean coast there is a stretch of Amazon–Orinoco–Southern Caribbean mangroves. 
To the east it adjoins the Magdalena–Urabá moist forests near the Caribbean coast, and then adjoins the Northwestern Andean montane forests ecoregion along the Andes to the east.
On the Pacific coast there are stretches of South American Pacific mangroves.
In the southeast an arm of the Patía Valley dry forests reaches down to the ecoregion. 
In the extreme south the ecoregion merges into the Western Ecuador moist forests ecoregion.

Terrain 
It includes the western slopes of the Andes and the Cerro Torrá, Serranía del Darién, Sierra Llorona de San Blas and Serranía del Baudó massifs.
Terrain includes recently formed alluvial plains, hills formed in the Tertiary and Pleistocene from dissection of sediments, and older Mesozoic era rocks in the mountains.
The soils are typically red clay laterite, leached of most nutrients by the heavy rain.
Younger and more fertile soils are found along the Andes and in the main river floodplains.

The ecoregion contains the basin of the Atrato River in the north, and further south the basins of the Baudó, San Juan, San Juan de Micay and Patía rivers. 
The heavy rainfall gives these rivers great power, cutting deep gorges through the mountains with dramatic falls and rapids in the upper reaches.
Lower down the rivers broaden out and meander through the plains.

Climate 
At a sample location at coordinates  the Köppen climate classification is "Af": equatorial; fully humid.

Ecology 

The ecoregion is in the Neotropical realm, in the tropical and subtropical moist broadleaf forests biome.
The rainforests are some of the richest in the world.
The ecoregion is part of the Tumbes–Chocó–Magdalena biodiversity hotspot.

Flora 

There are at least 8,000 vascular plant species in the ecoregion, perhaps over 10,000, of which almost 20% are found nowhere else.
The mix of flora depends on elevation, water levels and the influence of the sea.
Many species are locally endemic, found only in small regions, so there is considerable diversity from one area to another.
There are no endemic families, but several endemic genera. Some genera, such as Trianaeopiper and Cremosperma, have many species.

Generally the lowland rain forests in the north hold trees associated with cow tree (Brosimum utile), with groves of bongo (Cavanillesia platanifolia), wild cashew (Anacardium excelsum), Panama rubber (Castilla elastica), snakewood or bastard breadnut (Brosimum guianense), Bombacopsis species,  kapok tree (Ceiba pentandra) and tonka bean (Dipteryx oleifera). 
There are large emergent trees that rise above the canopy.
The understory is rich in Mabea occidentalis and Clidemia, Conostegia and Miconia species. 
Periodically flooded areas are often rich in cativo (Prioria copaifera).
The southern part the rain forest has two strata of trees, and large emergent trees, with flourishing lianas and epiphytes.

The central zone has rain forests at higher altitudes and wet or very wet forests lower down.
Vegetation includes formations that would otherwise be found only in cloud forests, with thick moss and other types of non-vascular epiphytes on the tree trunks and branches, and with diverse species of woody hemiepiphyte lianas of the Ericaceae, Marcgraviaceae and Melastomataceae families.
There are many slender trees.
In the north and south near the coast, where there is a dry season, there are greater numbers of deciduous plants.
Above an elevation of  common species include Inga species, cariseco (Billia colombiana), Brosimum species, Sorocea species, Jacaranda hesperia, Pourouma bicolor, Guatteria ferruginea, Cecropia species, Elaegia utilis and Brunellia species.

Fauna 

There is high diversity of fauna in the Chocó–Darién moist forests ecoregion, and many endemic species.
The extremely high rainfall makes it difficult for many vertebrates to travel, forming gap in the distribution of several primates and other mammals.
Vulnerable or endangered mammal species include Geoffroy's tamarin (Saguinus geoffroyi), giant anteater (Myrmecophaga tridactyla), cougar (Puma concolor), ocelot (Leopardus pardalis) and jaguar (Panthera onca).
Other endangered mammals include black-headed spider monkey (Ateles fusciceps), Geoffroy's spider monkey (Ateles geoffroyi), Gorgas's rice rat (Oryzomys gorgasi) and Baird's tapir (Tapirus bairdii).

577 species of birds have been recorded.
The most diverse family is tyrant flycatcher (Tyrannidae) with 28 genera and 60 species.
The ecoregion is a center of bird endemism, with at least 60 species with restricted ranges.
These include the Choco tinamou (Crypturellus kerriae), Baudó oropendola (Psarocolius cassini), viridian dacnis (Dacnis viguieri), crested ant tanager (Habia cristata), Lita woodpecker (Piculus litae) and plumbeous forest falcon (Micrastur plumbeus). 
Other rare birds include the harpy eagle (Harpia harpyja), black-and-white hawk-eagle (Spizaetus melanoleucus), and perhaps the speckled antshrike (Xenornis setifrons), although this last may no longer be present in Colombia.
Endangered birds also include great green macaw (Ara ambiguus), rufous-brown solitaire (Cichlopsis leucogenys), banded ground cuckoo (Neomorphus radiolosus), Baudo guan (Penelope ortoni) and Baudó oropendola (Psarocolius cassini).

There are records of 97 reptile species, including 35 from the family Colubridae and 26 from the family Iguanidae.
Endangered reptiles include Dunn's spinytail lizard (Morunasaurus groi) and Boulenger's least gecko (Sphaerodactylus scapularis).
There are at least 127 amphibian species.
Endangered amphibians include the elegant stubfoot toad (Atelopus elegans), El Tambo stubfoot toad (Atelopus longibrachius), Lynch's stubfoot toad (Atelopus lynchi), Costa Rican variable harlequin toad (Atelopus varius), horned marsupial frog (Gastrotheca cornuta), lemur leaf frog (Hylomantis lemur), Lehmann's poison frog (Oophaga lehmanni), golden poison frog (Phyllobates terribilis) and Myers' Surinam toad (Pipa myersi).

Status 

The World Wide Fund for Nature (WWF) gives the region the status of "Relatively Stable/Intact".
The northern parts in Colombia have mostly been replaced by banana plantations and cattle ranches.
The southern areas have been partly replaced by oil palm plantations, and are being deforested for paper pulp.
Most of the intact forest is in the central area.
However, the remaining blocks of habitat in 1995 were large, intact and well-connected.
There is high potential for research and ecotourism.
Some areas of secondary forest may be almost 500 years old, suitable for research into tropical forest regeneration.

As of 1995 10% to 20% of the original habitat had been destroyed, with one source at the time claiming 3.5% was being altered each year.
The Chocó forests supply half of Colombia's wood, and the main threat comes from deforestation and resultant erosion.
The Inter-American Highway in the Darien region is causing degradation of the habitat.
Industrial development is a threat. 
The naval base at the entry to Málaga Bay may disrupt humpback whale reproduction.
Other threats come from plantations of African oil palm (Elaeis guineensis), gold mining and coca growing.

The  Darién National Park is also a UNESCO World Heritage Site. 
Other areas with some protection in Panama include the  Kuna-Yala indigenous reserve and the  Embera Wounan reserve. 
Other parts of the ecoregion in Panama have been set aside as mining reserves or are used for agriculture.

These include the  Los Katíos National Park, which borders the Darien National Park of Panama, the  Ensenada de Utria National Park, with land and marine sectors, the  Sanquianga National Natural Park and the  Gorgona Island National Park.
Parts of the ecoregion are also protected by the lower parts of the Farallones de Cali National Park and Munchique National Natural Park. Another large park in the area is Paramillo National Natural Park.

References

Bibliography 

 
 
 
 

 
Neotropical tropical and subtropical moist broadleaf forests
Ecoregions of Colombia
Ecoregions of Panama